The 1901 State of the Union Address was given on Tuesday, December 3, 1901, by the 26th president of the United States, Theodore Roosevelt.  It was presented to both houses of the 57th United States Congress, but he was not present.  He stated, "The Congress assembles this year under the shadow of a great calamity. On the sixth of September, President McKinley was shot by an anarchist while attending the Pan-American Exposition at Buffalo, and died in that city on the fourteenth of that month." He concluded it with, "Indeed, from every quarter of the civilized world we received, at the time of the President's death, assurances of such grief and regard as to touch the hearts of our people. In the midst of our affliction we reverently thank the Almighty that we are at peace with the nations of mankind; and we firmly intend that our policy shall be such as to continue unbroken these international relations of mutual respect and good will."

References

State of the Union addresses
Presidency of Theodore Roosevelt
Works by Theodore Roosevelt
57th United States Congress
State of the Union Address
State of the Union Address
State of the Union Address
State of the Union Address
December 1901 events
State of the Union
Assassination of William McKinley